Bernard Charles Olsen (September 11, 1919 – March 30, 1977) was a center fielder in Major League Baseball. He played for the Chicago Cubs.

References

External links

1919 births
1977 deaths
Major League Baseball center fielders
Chicago Cubs players
Baseball players from Massachusetts
Politicians from Everett, Massachusetts
Nashville Vols players